Peace by Piece is the ninth album by San Francisco psychedelic rock band Quicksilver Messenger Service and the first to be released with guitarist Gary Duncan at the sole command. A later released CD-version includes two bonus tracks, entitled "Crazy Jesse" and "Electric Love".

Reception
Gary Duncan, guitarist for Quicksilver Messenger Service since the 1960s, formed a band in the mid-1980s that he variously called Quicksilver and Gary Duncan Quicksilver. Peace by Piece is its first release. 

In his 1-star review for AllMusic.com, William Ruhlmann panned the effort, saying in part, "[This is] an album that has nothing to do with Quicksilver Messenger Service and isn't any good."

Track listing
"Good Thang" – (Duncan, Piazza) 4:41
"24 Hours Deja Vu" – (Duncan, Piazza) 4:31
"Midnight Sun" – (Duncan, Piazza) 5:20
"Swamp Girl" – (Michael Brown) 5:51
"Wild in the City" – (Duncan, Piazza) 5:16
"Pool Hall Chili" – (Duncan, Piazza) 4:27
"Pistolero" – (Duncan, Piazza) 5:07
"Peace by Piece" – (Duncan, Piazza) 9:54

Personnel
 Gary Duncan – guitar, vocals, synthesizer
 Sammy Piazza – drums, percussion
Additional personnel
 W. Michael Lewis – piano, synthesizer
 Raul Rekow – percussion
 John Santos – percussion
 Jules Broussard – saxophones
 Martin Fierro – saxophone
 Steve Schuster – saxophone
 David Freiberg – vocals
 Kathi McDonald – vocals
 Linda Imperial – vocals
 Jo Baker – vocals

References

Quicksilver Messenger Service albums
1986 albums
Capitol Records albums